Ben Dunne Gyms is an Irish chain of gyms, with six locations in Ireland. The company was founded in June 1997 when it opened its first gym in Blanchardstown, Dublin. Originally a "mid to high end full service health club chain", the company reevaluated the market and subsequently focused on providing "no frills gym facilities" at lower prices.

By 2012, the group had over 40,000 members, increasing to 53,000 members (and 90 staff) by 2020.

References

External links 
 Ben Dunne Gyms website

Health clubs
Medical and health organisations based in Ireland